Charles Tibingana Mwesigye (born 28 August 1994) is a former footballer who played as a right winger. Born in Uganda, he represented Rwanda at international level.

Career
Born in Mbarara, Uganda, Tibingana has played club football for Proline, Victoria University, APR, Bullets, AS Kigali and Yala United.

He made his senior international debut for Rwanda in 2011, and competed at the 2011 FIFA U-17 World Cup.

References

1994 births
Living people
Ugandan footballers
Rwandan footballers
Rwanda international footballers
Rwanda under-20 international footballers
Rwanda youth international footballers
Proline FC players
SC Victoria University players
APR F.C. players
AS Kigali FC players
Charles Tibingana
Charles Tibingana
Bugesera FC players
Association football wingers
Rwandan expatriate footballers
Rwandan expatriate sportspeople in Malawi
Expatriate footballers in Malawi
Rwandan expatriate sportspeople in Thailand
Expatriate footballers in Thailand
People from Mbarara